Events in the year 2017 in Macau, China.

Incumbents
 Chief Executive: Fernando Chui
 President of the Legislative Assembly: Ho Iat Seng

Events
 23 August - The landfall of Typhoon Hato in Macau.
 25 August - The first deployment of People's Liberation Army Macau Garrison in Macau by cleaning the streets in the aftermath of Typhoon Hato.

References

 
Years of the 21st century in Macau
Macau
Macau
2010s in Macau